Osborne Football Club was a Scottish rugby union club in Greenock of the nineteenth century.

History

A general meeting of the Osborne Football Club was advertised in the Greenock Telegraph and Clyde Shipping Gazette of 20 October 1874. The meeting was scheduled for Thursday 22 October 1874 and to be held in the Greenock Mechanics Institute at 7pm. The club secretary was stated as A. Macnair.

Another general meeting was scheduled and advertised again in the Greenock Telegraph and Clyde Shipping Gazette of 17 May 1875. Again this took place in the Mechanics Institute on Tuesday 18 May 1875 at 8pm. The notice stated: 'A full attendance is requested as business of importance will be transacted.'

Another meeting was held on 14 September 1875 in the Mechanics Institute. Another was on 22 August 1876. The meeting moved venue to the Museum Hotel on 30 March 1877.

The club's annual dinner was held at the Museum Hotel on Friday 13 April 1877 and purveyed 'in her usual excellent manner' by Miss Ferguson. Club statements were produced and the club was noted as being 'in a flourishing and healthy condition'.

One of the fixtures of the 1875–76 season was the 1XV match between Paisley Football Club and Osborne on 27 November 1875 held at Paisley.

The 2nd XV of Osborne played Glasgow West End at the latter's Bentinck Park on Saturday 19 January 1878. West End won the match by 1 goal and 1 try to Osborne's  1 goal. It was noted that R. Steel, Hill, Forrest and Adam were prominent for the West End; and Wilson, Campell and Buchanan were prominent for Osborne.

Campbell was the club captain. On 5 February 1878 the club had a presentation for him; in honour of his moving abroad. Campbell received a valuable collection of books from the club.

The club had another meeting on 24 September 1878 in Borland's Temperance Hotel at 8pm to elect office-bearers for the new season. The club secretary signed the advert W.F.D. Office-bearers were approved and the first game of the new season was on 12 October 1878.

However, there are no reports of this match taking place; and it is assumed that the club folded at the start of this season.

Selected matches

Matches reported in newspapers. Only 1st team matches shown. Osborne try-scorers noted where given.

Decline of the rugby union club

There are no reports of any matches from 1878 to 1879 season onwards. The loss of the club captain may not have helped. The club's playing field was on farmland at Berryyards in Greenock; which was a farmstead built on an ancient fruit garden. However the site was taken over by the Berryyards Sugar Refinery.

Other sports

Osborne also had a cricket club. The cricket club played at Smithston. The Greenock directory of 1876-77 states that the Osborne cricket club was founded in 1868 and gives the following details.
Ground, Smithston Park.
The office-bearers for the year are as follows : — President, Mr A. S.
M'Lachlan ; captain, Mr John Lawson ; honorary treasurer, Mr George
Sutherland, Roxburgh Street ; honorary secretary, Mr D. Ferguson
Miller, 13 Lyle Street. Committee— Messrs Henry Bowden, William
Waddell, George S. Deas, John M. Gallacher ; with the captain,
president, secretary and treasurer. Subscription, 10s 6d.
The Linside cricket club was playing Osborne Cricket Club on 18 July 1874 at Smithfield.

References

Scottish rugby union teams
Rugby union in Inverclyde
Defunct Scottish rugby union clubs
1874 establishments in Scotland
Rugby clubs established in 1874
Rugby union clubs disestablished in 1878
Greenock